The bibliography of Kimitake Hiraoka, pen name Yukio Mishima, includes novels, novellas, short stories and literary essays, as well as plays that were written not only in a contemporary-style, but also in the style of classical Japanese theatre, particularly in the genres of noh and kabuki. However, although Mishima took themes, titles and characters from the noh canon, he included his own twists and modern settings, such as hospitals and ballrooms, which startled audiences who were accustomed to the long-settled originals.

In total, Mishima wrote 34 novels (including some entertainment novels), about 50 plays, 25 books of short stories, and at least 35 books of essays, one libretto, as well as one film.

Novels
 Tōzoku (盗賊 Thieves), 1948 
 Tōzoku―Dai 1-Shō Monogatari no Hottan (Koi no Shūkyoku soshite Monogatari no Hottan) (盗賊 第1章 物語の発端 (恋の終局そして物語の発端) Thieves―Chapter 1 Beginning of a Story （End of Love, and The Beginning of a Story）) 1948 
 Tōzoku―Dai 2-Shō Kesshin to sono Fushigina Kōka (Jisatsu Kitosha) (盗賊 第2章 決心とその不思議な効果 (自殺企画者) Thieves―Chapter 2 Determination and The Mysterious Effect （Suicide Planner）) 1947 
 Tōzoku―Dai 3-Shō Deai (盗賊 第3章 出会 Thieves―Chapter 3 Encounter) 1948 
 Tōzoku―Dai 4-Shō Shūto na Kyōbō―Jō (Biteki Seikatsusha) (盗賊 第4章 周到な共謀―上 (美的生活者) Thieves―Chapter 4 Careful Conspiracy―upper (One Who Lives Beauty) ) 1948 
 Tōzoku―Dai 5-Shō Shūto na Kyōbō―Ge (Karei) (盗賊 第5章 周到な共謀―下 (嘉例) Thieves―Chapter 5 Careful Conspiracy―second (An Auspicious Occasion)) 1948 
 Tōzoku―Dai 6-Shō Jikkō―Mijikaki Daidanen (盗賊 第6章 実行―短き大団円 Thieves―Chapter 6 Practice―Short Grand finale) 1948 
 Kamen no Kokuhaku (仮面の告白 Confessions of a Mask), 1949
 Ai no Kawaki (愛の渇き Thirst for Love), 1950
 Junpaku no Yoru (純白の夜 Pure White Nights), 1950
 Ao no Jidai (青の時代 The Age of Blue), 1950
 Natsuko no Bōken (夏子の冒険 Natsuko's Adventure), 1951
 Nippon-sei (につぽん製 Made in Japan), 1952-1953
 Kinijiki (禁色 Forbidden Colors)
 Kinijiki (禁色 Forbidden Colors), 1951
 Higyō (秘楽 Secret Pleasure), 1953
 Koi no Miyako (恋の都 The Capital of Love), 1954
 Shiosai (潮騒 The Sound of Waves), 1954
 Megami (女神 Goddess), 1954-1955
 Shizumeru Taki (沈める滝 The Sunken Waterfall), 1955
 Kōfukugō Shuppan (幸福号出帆 The S.S. Happiness Sets Sail), 1955（Book Published in 1956）
 Kinkaku-ji (金閣寺 The Temple of the Golden Pavilion), 1956
 Nagasugita Haru (永すぎた春 Too Much of Spring), 1956
 Bitoku no Yoromeki (美徳のよろめき The Misstepping of Virtue), 1957
 Kyōko no Ie (鏡子の家 Kyoko's House), 1959
 Kyōko no Ie Dai-1 bu (鏡子の家 第一部 Kyoko's House, pt. 1)
 Kyōko no Ie Dai-2 bu (鏡子の家 第二部 Kyoko's House, pt. 2)
 Utage no Ato (宴のあと After the Banquet), 1960
 Ojōsan (お嬢さん The Mademoiselle), 1960
 Kemono no Tawamure (獣の戯れ The Frolic of the Beasts), 1961
 Utsukushii Hoshi (美しい星 Beautiful Star), 1962
 Ai no Shissō (愛の疾走 Dash of Love), 1963
 Gogo no Eikō (午後の曳航 The Sailor Who Fell from Grace with the Sea), 1963
 Nikutai no Gakkō (肉体の学校 The School of Flesh), 1963（Book Published in 1964）
 Kinu to Meisatsu (絹と明察 Silk and Insight), 1964
 Ongaku (音楽 The Music), 1964
 Fukuzatsuna Kare (複雑な彼 That Complicated Guy), 1966
 Yakaifuku (夜会服 Evening Dress), 1967
 Mishima Yukio Letter Kyōshitsu (三島由紀夫レター教室 Letters―Yukio Mishima's Letter Lessons), 1967-1968
 Inochi Urimasu (命売ります Life for Sale), 1968
 Hōjō no Umi (豊饒の海 The Sea of Fertility tetralogy)
 Haru no Yuki (春の雪 Spring Snow), 1965-1967（Book Published in 1969）
 Honba (奔馬 Runaway Horses), 1967-1968（Book Published in 1969）
 Akatsuki no Tera (暁の寺 The Temple of Dawn), 1968-1970（Book Published in 1970）
 Tennin Gosui (天人五衰 The Decay of the Angel), 1970-1971（Book Published in 1971）

Short stories

 Sukampo―Akihiko no osanaki omoide (酸模―秋彦の幼き思ひ出 Sorrel Flowers—Akihiko's Memory of the Early Childhood), 1938
 Yakata (館 Mansion), 1939, an unfinished and unpublished Short Story
 Damie-garasu (彩絵硝子 Colored Picture Glass), 1940
 Hanazakari no Mori (花ざかりの森 The Forest in Full Bloom), 1941（Book Published in 1944）
 Ottō to Maya (苧菟と瑪耶 Ottō and Maya), 1942
 Minomo no Tsuki (みのもの月 The Reflection of the Moon), 1942 
 Yoyo ni Nokosan (世々に残さん For Posterity), 1943 
 Yoru no Kuruma (夜の車 A Car in the Night), 1944 
 Title changed to Chusei ni okeru Ichi Satsujin-Jōshūsha no nokoseru Tetsugakuteki Nikki no Bassui (中世に於ける一殺人常習者の遺せる哲学的日記の抜粋 Philosophical Diary of a Serial Killer from Middle Ages) 
 Esugai no Kari (エスガイの狩 Esugai's Hunting), 1945
 Chūsei (中世 The Middle Ages), 1946
 Tabako (煙草 Cigarette), 1946
 Misaki nite no Monogatari (岬にての物語 A Story at the Cape), 1946
 Koi to Betsuri to (恋と別離と Love, and Parting), 1947
 Karu no Miko to Sotoori Hime (軽王子と衣通姫 Prince Karu and Princess Sotoori), 1947
 Yoru no Shitaku (夜の仕度 Preparations for the Evening), 1947 (Book Published in 1948)
 Raudo Supika (ラウドスピーカー Loudspeaker), 1947
 Haruko (春子 Haruko), 1947
 Sakasu (サーカス The Circus), 1948
 Hakuchō (白鳥 Swan), 1948
 Junkyō (殉教 Martyrdom), 1948
 Kazoku Awase (家族合せ Family Card Game), 1948
 Kashiramoji (頭文字 Initials), 1948
 Jizen (慈善 Charity), 1948
 Hōseki Baibai (宝石売買 Precious Stone Broker), 1948
 Tsumibito (罪びと The Offender), 1948
 Kōshoku (好色 Sensuality), 1948
 Fujitsu na Yogasa (不実な洋傘 The Unfaithful Umbrella), 1948
 Yagi no Kubi (山羊の首 A Goat's Head), 1948
 Shishi (獅子 Lion), 1948
 Kōfuku to iu Byōki no Ryōhō (幸福といふ病気の療法 Treatment for the Sickness named Happiness), 1949
 Koi no Omoni (恋重荷 The Heavy Burden of Love), 1949
 Daijin (大臣 The Cabinet Minister), 1949
 Magun no Tsūka (魔群の通過 Passing of a Host of Devils), 1949
 Jidō (侍童 Page), 1949
 Tengoku ni Musubu Koi (天国に結ぶ恋 Love Ordained in Heaven), 1949
 Fuin (訃音 Obituary), 1949
 Butaigeiko (舞台稽古 Stage Rehearsal), 1949
 Taikutsu na Tabi (退屈な旅 Boring Journey), 1949
 Shinsetsu na Kikai (親切な機械 The Polite Machine), 1949
 Kōkyō (孝経 The Book of Filial Piety), 1949
 Kazan no Kyūka (火山の休暇 Volcano Vacation), 1949
 Kaibutsu (怪物 The Monster), 1949
 Hanayama-in (花山院 Hanayama Temple) 1950, 
 Kajitsu (果実 Fruits), 1950
 Enō (鴛鴦 The Mandarin Ducks), 1950
 Shugaku Ryokō (修学旅行 Field Trip), 1950
 Nichiyōbi (日曜日 Sunday), 1950
 Tōnori-kai (遠乗会 Long Distance Riding Club), 1950 （Book Published in 1951）
 Kokei Monmon (孤閨悶々 Alone and Yearning), 1950
 Kuidōraku (食道楽 Gluttony), 1950
 Mesu-inu (牝犬 A Female Dog), 1950
 Joryū Risshiden (女流立志伝 The Story of a Successful Woman), 1951
 Katei Saiban (家庭裁判 Family Litigation), 1951
 Idai na Shimai (偉大な姉妹 The Remarkable Sisters), 1951
 Hakone-Zaiku (箱根細工 Hakone-Work), 1951
 Isu (椅子 The Chair), 1951
 Shi no Shima (死の島 Island of Death), 1951
 Tsubasa (翼 Wings), 1951
 Migi Ryoshū Tsukamatsuri Sōrō (右領収仕候 Paid in Full), 1951
 Tenagahime (手長姫 The Long-Armed Princess), 1951
 Asagao (朝顔 Morning Glory), 1951
 Keitaiyō (携帯用 Portable), 1951
 Rikyū no Matsu (離宮の松 The Pinetree on the Palace Grounds), 1951
 Kurosu-Wado-Pazuru (クロスワード・パズル Crossword Puzzle), 1952
 Kingyo to Okusama (金魚と奥様 Goldfish and Madam), 1952
 Manatsu no Shi (真夏の死 Death in Midsummer), 1952
 Futari no Roujō (二人の老嬢 Two Old Maids), 1952
 Bishin (美神 Goddess of Beauty), 1952
 Eguchi Hatsu-jo Oboegaki (江口初女覚書 Memorabilia of Eguchi Hatsu), 1953
 Hina no Yado (雛の宿 The House of Dolls), 1953
 Tabi no Bohimei (旅の墓碑銘 Epitaph for a Journey), 1953
 Kyū-teisha (急停車 A Sudden Stop), 1953
 Tamago (卵 Eggs, Tamago), 1953
 Fuman na Onnatachi (不満な女たち Unsatisfied Women), 1953
 Hanabi (花火 Fireworks), 1953
 Radige no Shi (ラディゲの死 The Death of Radiguet), 1953
 Hakurankai (博覧会 The Exhibition), 1954
 Geijutsu Gitsune (芸術狐 Pseudo Art), 1954
 Kagi no Kakaru Heya (鍵のかかる部屋 A Room to be locked), 1954
 Fukushū (復讐 Revenge), 1954
 Shi o Kaku Shōnen (詩を書く少年 The Boy Who Wrote Poetry), 1954 （Book Published in 1956）
 Shigadera Shōnin no Koi (志賀寺上人の恋 The Priest of Shiga Temple and His Love), 1954
 Mizuoto (水音 The Sound of Water), 1954
 Umi to Yuyake (海と夕焼 Sea and Sunset), 1955
 Shimbun-gami (新聞紙 Swaddling Clothes), 1955
 Akinai-bito (商ひ人 The Shopkeeper), 1955
 Yama no Tamashii (山の魂 The Spirit of the Mountain), 1955
 Yane o Ayumu (屋根を歩む Walking on the Roof), 1955
 Botan (牡丹 Peonies), 1955
 Jūkyu-sai (十九歳 Nineteen Years Old), 1956
 Ashi no Seiza (足の星座 Foot Constellation), 1956
 Segaki-bune (施餓鬼舟 The Requiem Boat), 1956
 Hashi-zukushi (橋づくし The Seven Bridges), 1956
 Onnagata, (女方 Onnagata), 1957
 Kiken (貴顕 The Dignitary), 1957
 Hyakuman-en Sembei (百万円煎餅 Three Million Yen), 1960
 Ai no Shokei (愛の処刑 Love's Penance), 1960
 Sutā (スタア Star), 1960
 Yūkoku (憂國 Patriotism), 1960
 Ichigo (苺 Strawberries), 1961
 Bōshi no Hana (帽子の花 Flowers on a Hat), 1962
 Mahōbin (魔法瓶 Thermos Flasks), 1962
 Tsuki (月 Moon), 1962
 Budōpan (葡萄パン Raisin Bread), 1963
 Shinju (真珠 The Pearl), 1963
 Jidōsha (自動車 The Car), 1963
 Kawaisō na Papa (可哀さうなパパ Unlucky Papa), 1963
 Ame no naka no funsui (雨のなかの噴水 Fountains in the Rain), 1963
 Kippu (切符 The Ticket), 1963
 Ken (剣 Sword), 1963
 Gettan-sō Kitan (月澹荘奇譚 The Mystery of the Gettan Villa), 1965
 Mikumano Mōde (三熊野詣 Acts of Worship), 1965
 Kujaku (孔雀 The Peacocks), 1965
 Asa no Jun'ai (朝の純愛 Love in the Morning), 1965
 Nakama (仲間 The Company), 1966
 Eirei no Koe (英霊の聲 The Voices of the Heroic Dead), 1966
 Kōya yori (荒野より  From the Depth of Solitude), 1966
 Ranryō-ō (蘭陵王 Prince of Lanling), 1969

Short story collections
 Hanazakari no Mori (花ざかりの森 The Forest in Full Bloom), 1944
 Misaki nite no Monogatari (岬にての物語 A Story at the Cape), 1947
 Yoru no Shitaku (夜の仕度 Preparations for the Evening), 1948
 Magun no Tsūka (魔群の通過 Passing of a Host of Devils), 1949
 Kaibutsu (怪物 The Monster), 1950
 Manatsu no Shi (真夏の死 Death in Midsummer and other stories), 1953 — includes Patriotism
 Hashi-zukushi (橋づくし The Seven Bridges), 1958
 Sutā (スタア Movie Star), 1961
 Mikumano Mōde (三熊野詣 Acts of Worship), 1965

Plays

Shingeki
 Rotei (路程 The Journey), 1939, unpublished.
 Ayame (あやめ Iris), 1948
 Kataku (火宅 Burning House), 1948
 Ai no Fuan (愛の不安 The Anxiety of Love), 1949
 Tōdai (灯台 The Lighthouse), 1949
 Niobe (ニオベ Niobe), 1949
 Seijo (聖女 The Holy Woman), 1949
 Tada Hodo Takai Mono wa Nai (只ほど高いものはない Nothing is as Expensive as Gratis), 1952
 Yoro no Himawari (夜の向日葵 Twilight Sunflower), 1953
 Wakodo yo Yomigaere (若人よ蘇れ Arise, Youth!), 1954
 Toketa Tennyo (溶けた天女  Celestial Beauty who Melted or Angel Lady who Melted), 1954
 Sangenshoku (三原色 Three Primary Colors), 1955
 Fune no Aisatsu (船の挨拶 Greetings at the Boat), 1955
 Shiroari no Su (白蟻の巣 The Nest of the White Ants or Termites' nest), 1955
 Daishōgai (大障碍 Steeplechase), 1956
 Rokumeikan (鹿鳴館 Rokumeikan), 1956
 Asa no Tsutsuji (朝の躑躅 Morning Azalea), 1957
 Bara to Kaizoku (薔薇と海賊 Roses and Pirates), 1958
 Onna wa Senryo Sarenai (女は占領されない Women Never Be Captured), 1959
 Nettaiju (熱帯樹 Tropical Tree: A Tragedy in Three Acts), 1960
 Toka no Kiku (十日の菊 Tenth-Day Chrysanthemums or The Day after the Fair), 1961
 Kuro-tokage (黒蜥蜴 The Black Lizard), 1961
 Yorokobi no Koto (喜びの琴 The Harp of Joy), 1964
 Koi no Hokage (恋の帆影 The Sails of Love), 1964
 Sado Kōshaku Fujin (サド侯爵夫人 Madame de Sade), 1965
 Suzaku Ke no Metsubo (朱雀家の滅亡 The Decline and Fall of the Suzaku), 1967
 Waga Tomo Hittorā (わが友ヒットラー My Friend Hitler), 1968
 Raiō no Terasu (癩王のテラス The Terrace of The Leper King), 1969

Modern Noh Plays
近代能楽集
 Kantan (邯鄲 The Magic Pillow), 1950
 Aya no Tsuzumi (綾の鼓 The Damask Drum), 1951
 Sotoba Komachi (卒塔婆小町 Komachi at the Stupa or Komachi at the Gravepost), 1952
 Aoi no Ue (葵上 The Lady Aoi), 1954
 Hanjo (班女 The Waiting Lady with the Fan), 1955
 Dōjōji (道成寺 Dōjō Temple), 1957
 Yuya, (熊野 Yuya), 1959
 Yoroboshi (弱法師 The Begging Monk or The Blind Young Man), 1960
 Genji Kuyō, (源氏供養 Memorial Service of Prince Genji), 1962
 Busu (附子 Busu), a Modern Kyogen play written in 1957, published in 1971, but was never performed professionally.
 Long After Love (Long After Love), a compilation of other Modern Noh plays for performance in New York, written in 1957, published in 1971

Kabuki
 Jigoku Hen (地獄変 Hell Screen), 1953 (based on Hell Screen, Ryūnosuke Akutagawa's short story)
 Iwashi Uri Koi Hikiami (鰯売恋曳網 The Sardine Seller's Net of Love), 1954
 Yuya (Kabuki), (熊野 (歌舞伎) Yuya (Kabuki) )1955
 Fuyō no Tsuyu Ōuchi Jikki (芙蓉露大内実記 The Blush on the White Hibiscus Blossom: Lady Fuyo and the True Account of the Ōuchi Clan), 1955
 Musume-gonomi Obi Tori no Ike (むすめごのみ帯取池 Sash Stealing Pond), 1958
 Chinsetsu Yumiharizuki (椿説弓張月 Half Moon (like a Bow and arrow setting up): The Adventures of Tametomo or literally A Wonder Tale: The Moonbow), 1969

Ballet
 Miranda, (ミランダ Miranda), 1968

Libretto
 Minoko, (美濃子 Minoko), 1964

Buyō
 Hade-kurabe Chikamatsu Musume (艶競近松娘 The Charming Figure Competition of Chikamatsu Girls), 1951
 Muromachi Hangonkō (室町反魂香 The Dead Appearance Incense in Muromachi) 1953
 Hashi-zukushi (Buyō) (橋づくし (舞踊) The Seven Bridges (Buyō)), 1958

Translated adaptations
 Racine's Britannicus, 1957
 Oscar Wilde's Salome, 1960
 Puccini's Tosca, 1963
 Victor Hugo's Ruy Blas, 1966

Criticisms and essays, etc.
 Sōmonka no Genryu, (相聞歌の源流 The Source of the Love Poem), 1948
 Jushosha no Kyoki, (重症者の兇器 The Murder Weapon of Seriously Ill Person), 1948
 Dan Kazuo no Hiai (檀一雄の悲哀 The Pathos of Kazuo Dan), 1951
 Kogen Hoteru (高原ホテル A Hotel in the Highlands), 1951
 Aporo no Sakazuki (アポロの杯 The Cup of Apollo), 1952, Travelogue
 Hoku-bei Kikō (Amerika Nikki) (北米紀行 (あめりか日記) North America Travelogue (American Diary))
 Nan-bei Kikō (San Pauro no "Hato no Machi") (南米紀行 (サン・パウロの「鳩の街」) South America Travelogue (Sao Paulo's "Pigeon Town"))
 Ōshū Kikō (欧州紀行 Europe Travelogue)
 Tabi no Omoide (旅の思ひ出  Memories of the Travel)
 Eien no Tabibito―Kawabata Yasunari-shi no Hito to Sakuhin (永遠の旅人―川端康成氏の人と作品  The Eternal Traveler―Yasunari Kawabata's Personality and Works), 1956
 Shin Renai Kōza (新恋愛講座 New Lectures about Love), 1956
 Bodi-biru tetsugaku (ボディ・ビル哲学 Philosophy of Bodybuilding), 1956
 Gakuya de kakareta Engeki-ron, (楽屋で書かれた演劇論 Backstage Essays), 1957
 Tabi no Ehon, (旅の絵本 Picture Book of a Journey), 1957 (Book Published in 1958), New York Travelogue
 Ratai to Ishō, (裸体と衣裳 Naked body and Apparel), 1959 Dairy 
 Fudōtoku Kyōiku Kōza (不道徳教育講座 Lectures on Immoral Education) 
 Fudōtoku Kyōiku Kōza (不道徳教育講座 Lectures on Immoral Education), 1959
 Zoku Fudōtoku Kyōiku Kōza (続不道徳教育講座 Continued Lectures on Immoral Education), 1960
 Jū-hachi-sai to Sanjū-yon-sai no Shōzōga (十八歳と三十四歳の肖像画 With 18 and 34 years:Two Portraits), 1959
 Shakai Ryōri Mishima-tei (社会料理三島亭 Cooking of Societies―Kitchen Mishima), 1960
 Hitotsu no Seijiteki iken (一つの政治的意見 Party of One), 1960
 Dai-ichi no Sei (第一の性 The First Gender), 1964
 Kyokugen to Riariti (極限とリアリティー Extremity and Reality), 1964
 Kanojo mo Naita, Watashi mo Naita―Joshi Bare (彼女も泣いた、私も泣いた―女子バレー She Cried, and I Cried―Women Volleyball), 1964 Tokyo Olympic Reports
 Watashi no Henreki Jidai (私の遍歴時代 My Wandering Period), 1963 （Book Published in 1964）, autobiography
 Me―Aru Geijutu Dansō (目―ある芸術断想 Eye―Fragmentary Thoughts about Art), 1965
 Han-teijo Daigaku (反貞女大学 College of Unchasteness), 1965 （Book Published in 1966）
 Ochaduke Nashonarizum (お茶漬ナショナリズム Chazuke Nationalism), 1966 
 Ni-ni-roku Jiken to Watashi (二・二六事件と私 February 26 Incident and I), 1966 
 Kokinshū to Shin-Kokinshū (古今集と新古今集 Kokin Wakashū and Shin Kokin Wakashū), 1967
 Hagakure Nyūmon (葉隠入門 Introduction to Hagakure or  Hagakure: Samurai Ethic and Modern Japan, On Hagakure, The Way of the Samurai), 1967
 Taiyō to Tetsu (太陽と鉄 Sun and Steel: Art, Action and Ritual Death), 1968, a collection of autobiographical essays.
 F104 (エピロオグ―F104 Epilogue―F104) 1968
 Owari no bigaku (をはりの美学 Aesthetics of Ending) 1966
 Bunka Bōei-ron (文化防衛論 Defense of the Culture), 1968 （Book Published in 1969）
 Wakaki Samurai no tameno Seishin Kōwa (若きサムラヒのための精神講話 Spiritual Lessons for Young Samurai), 1969 
Book title is Wakaki Samurai no tameni (若きサムラヒのために Lectures for Young Samurai) 
 Jieitai Nibun-ron (自衛隊二分論 Theory of Dividing Japan Self-Defense Forces into Two), 1968 （Book Published in 1969）
 Kōdōgaku Nyūmon (行動学入門 Introductions to the Philosophy of Action), 1969 （Book Published in 1970）
 STAGE-LEFT IS RIGHT FROM AUDIENCE (舞台の左は観客からは右(沖縄と蝶々夫人の子供) Okinawa and Madame Butterfly's Offspring), 1969 - Abridged translation
 Tatenokai no koto (「楯の会」のこと The Shield Society), 1969
 Shosetsu towa Nanika (小説とは何か What is Novel), 1970 （Book Published in 1972）
 Nihon Bungaku Shoshi (日本文学小史 Some Histories of Japanese Literature), 1969 （Book Published in 1972）, an unfinished Literary criticism
 Aku no Hana (悪の華 The Flower of Evil: Kabuki), 1970
 Hatashi ete inai Yakusoku―Watashi no nakano Nijūgo-nen (果たし得てゐない約束―私の中の二十五年 The Promise that haven't fulfilled―25 years in me), 1970
 Kakumei tetsugaku toshiteno Yomegaku (革命哲学としての陽明学  Yang-ming Thought as Revolutionary Philosophy), 1970
 Koma (独楽 A Top), 1970

Lectures
Nihon no Wakamono (日本の若者 Japanese Youth), 1961.9.18 - Holiday&University of California’s Symposium in Berkeley, California
Watashi wa ikanishite Nihon no sakka ni nattaka (私はいかにして日本の作家となつたか How I have been grown up as the Japanese writer), 1966.4.18 - Speech in Foreign Correspondents' Club of Japan

Statement
Geki (檄 An appeal), 1970.11.25

Poems
Icarus (イカロス Icarus), 1967 - Epilogue of Sun and Steel
Jisei no ku (Death poem) (辞世の句 Farewell poems of Yukio Mishima), 1970.11.25

Photo subjects
Barakei (薔薇刑 Ba Ra Kei: Ordeal by Rose), 1963 - photographer:Eikoh Hosoe
Otoko no shi (男の死 The Death of a Man), 1970 - photographer: Kishin Shinoyama (Unpublished)

Film
 Yūkoku (憂國 Patriotism), 1966

Film adaptations
 1951, August 31, Junpaku no Yoru (純白の夜 Pure White Nights), Directed by Hideo Ōba. Starring Michiyo Kogure, Masayuki Mori, and Yukio Mishima (as an Extra).
 1953, January 14, Natsuko no Boken (夏子の冒険 Natsuko's Adventure), Directed by Noboru Nakamura. Starring Rieko Sumi, Masao Wakahara, Keiko Awaji.
 1953, December 8, Nipponsei (にっぽん製 Made in Japan), Directed by Kōji Shima. Starring Fujiko Yamamoto, Ken Uehara.
 1954, October 20, Shiosai (潮騒 The Sound of Waves). Directed by Senkichi Taniguchi. Starring Akira Kubo, Kyōko Aoyama, Toshiro Mifune.
 1957, May 28, Nagasugita Haru (永すぎた春 Too Much of Spring). Directed by Shigeo Tanaka. Starring Ayako Wakao, Hiroshi Kawaguchi, Eiji Funakoshi.
 1957, October 29, Bitoku no Yoromeki (美徳のよろめき The Misstepping of Virtue). Directed by Kō Nakahira. Starring Yumeji Tukioka, Rentarō Mikuni.
 1958, August 19, Enjō (炎上 Conflagration) (金閣寺 The Temple of the Golden Pavilion). Directed by Kon Ichikawa. Starring Ichikawa Raizō, Tatsuya Nakadai, Ganjirō Nakamura.
 1959, January 9, Fudōtoku Kyōiku Kōza (不道徳教育講座 Lectures on Immoral Education), Directed by Katsumi Nishikawa. Starring Shirō Ōsaka, Yumeji Tukioka, Hiroyuki Nagato, Masumi Okada, and Yukio Mishima (as the Navigator).
 1959, February 24, Tōdai (灯台 The Lighthouse), Directed by Hedeo Suzuki. Starring Akira Kubo, Keiko Tsushima.
 1961, February 15, Ojōsan (お嬢さん Mademoiselle), Directed by Tarō Yuge. Starring Ayako Wakao, Hiroshi Kawaguchi.
 1962, March 14, Kurotokage (黒蜥蜴 The Black Lizard), Directed by Umeji Inoue. - Musical Film. Starring Machiko Kyō, Minoru Ōki.
 1964, March 14, Ken (剣 Sword). Directed by Kenji Misumi. Starring Ichikawa Raizō.
 1964, April 29, Shiosai (潮騒 The Sound of Waves), Directed by Kentarō Morinaga. Starring Sayuri Yoshinaga, Mitsuo Hamada.
 1964, May 23, Kemono no Tawamure (獣の戯れ The Flirtation of Beasts), Directed by Sōkichi Tomimoto. Starring Ayako Wakao.
 1965, February 14, Nikutai no Gakkō (肉体の学校 The School of Flesh), Directed by Ryō Kinoshita. Starring Kyōko Kishida, Tsutomu Yamazaki.
 1966, April 12, Yūkoku (憂國 Patriotism). Directed by Yukio Mishima and Domoto Masaki. Starring Yukio Mishima.
 1966, June 22, Fukuzatsuna Kare (複雑な彼 That Complicated Guy), Directed by Kōji Shima. Starring Jiro Tamiya, Mariko Taka, Nobuo Nakamura, Edith Hanson.
 1967, February 18, Ai no Kawaki (愛の渇き Thirst for Love). Directed by Koreyoshi Kurahara. Starring Ruriko Asaoka, Nobuo Nakamura.
 1968, August 14, Kurotokage (黒蜥蜴 The Black Lizard). Directed by Kinji Fukasaku. Starring Akihiro Miwa, Isao Kimura, and Yukio Mishima (as a Human Statue). Based on a novel by Edogawa Rampo and an adaptation by Yukio Mishima.
 1971, September 24, Shiosai (潮騒 The Sound of Waves), Directed by Shirō Moritani. Starring Itsuto Asahina, Midori Onozato.
 1972, November 11, Ongaku (音楽 The Music). Directed by Yasuzo Masumura.  Starring Noriko Kurosawa, Toshiyuki Hosokawa.
 1975, April 26, Shiosai (潮騒 The Sound of Waves), Directed by Katsumi Nishikawa. Starring Momoe Yamaguchi, Tomokazu Miura.
 1976, July 17, Kinkaku-ji (金閣寺 The Temple of the Golden Pavilion). Directed by Yoichi Takabayashi. Starring Saburo Shinoda, Toshio Shiba.
 1976, August 28, Gogo no Eikō  (午後の曳航 The Sailor Who Fell from Grace with the Sea). Directed by Lewis John Carlino. Starring Sarah Miles, Kris Kristofferson.
 1980, November 15, Kōfukugō Shuppan (幸福号出帆 The S.S. Happiness Sets Sail), Directed by Kōichi Saitō. Starring Mariko Fuji.
 1983, November 2, Ai no Shokei (愛の処刑 The Execution of Love), Directed by Masayoshi Nogami. Starring Hesuke Miki, Hajime Ishigami.
 1985, October 10, Shiosai (潮騒 The Sound of Waves), Directed by Tugunobu Kotani. Starring Chiemi Hori, Shingo Tsurumi, Tetsurō Tanba.
 1986, September 20, Rokumeikan (鹿鳴館 The Rokumeikan), Directed by Kon Ichikawa. Starring Ruriko Asaoka, Bunta Sugawara, Kōji Ishizaka, Kiichi Nakai, Kyōko Kishida, Yasuko Sawaguchi.
 1998, November 18, L'École de la chair (肉体の学校 The School of Flesh). Directed by Benoît Jacquot. Starring Isabelle Huppert, Vincent Martinez, Vincent Lindon, Jean-Louis Richard, Marthe Keller.
 2005, October 29, Haru no Yuki (春の雪 Spring Snow). Directed by Isao Yukisada. Starring Satoshi Tumabuki, Yūko Takeuchi, Sousuke Takaoka, Ayako Wakao.
 2017, May 26, Utsukusi Hoshi (美しい星  Beautiful Star). Directed by Daihachi Yoshida. Starring Lily Franky, Kazuya Kamenashi, Ai Hashimoto, Tomoko Nakajima, Kuranosuke Sasaki.

Starring
 1960, May 23, Karakkaze Yarō (からっ風野郎 Afraid to Die). Directed by Yasuzo Masumura. Starring Yukio Mishima and Ayako Wakao.
 1969, August 9, Hitokiri (人斬り Hitokiri). Directed by Hideo Gosha. Starring Shintaro Katsu, Tatsuya Nakadai, Yujiro Ishihara and Yukio Mishima.

References

Further reading 

 

Bibliographies by writer
Bibliographies of Japanese writers
Dramatist and playwright bibliographies
Bibliography